SADAT Inc. International Defense Consultancy is a private Turkish PMC headquartered in Istanbul, Turkey. It is the country's first domestic military consultancy firm, founded in 2012 by former Turkish Armed Forces (TSK) brigadier general, Adnan Tanrıverdi. The company operates within the Middle East and provides services such as military and interior training, defense consultancy, and ordnance procurement. SADAT's mission and purpose remains shrouded in controversy, facing allegations from anti-Justice and Development Party (AKP) sources. These allegations range from supporting establishing a private army loyal to President Tayyip Recep Erdogan. 
It has close communication and cooperation with the Turkish National Intelligence Organization. Sadat's CEO admits working with Turkish intelligence agency on March 21 2021.

Company profile
Adnan Tanriverdi, along with 22 other Turkish Armed Forces (TSK) officers and non-commissioned officers (NCOs), created SADAT Inc. on February 28, 2012. The organization maintained a board of directors including Adnan and four other members. His son, Mehli Tanriverdi, is the current chairman of the board. The company employees between 50 and 200 former TSK officers from various branches and specializations.
Its list of services include:
Consultancy
Training
Conventional Military Training
Unconventional Military Training
Special Forces Training
Ordnance
The company's stated mission is "establishing the connection among the Islamic countries in the sense of defense and military industries, in order to assist the Islamic world to take the rank it deserves among super world powers as a self-sufficient military power, by submitting them the services regarding the organization of armed forces, defense consultancy, military training, and ordnance."

SADAT Inc. has a sister organization, ASSAM, with a more political focus that was also headed by Adnan Tanriverdi until January 2020. It runs a strategic studies center and hosts annual conventions.

Activities

Connection to President Erdoğan and AKP
Following the attempted coup of July 15, 2016, President Erdoğan appointed Adnan Tanrıverdi to his cabinet as chief military counselor. The close relationship between Tanrıverdi and Erdoğan, who were relieved from political and military offices in the late 1990s for their Islamic convictions, has sparked allegations of corrupt behavior. These accusations including the belief that SADAT represents and exists as Erdoğan's "private militia".

Involvement against the 2016 coup d'état attempt
According to American Enterprise Institute's (AEI) Michael Rubin, SADAT personnel were active and participated in anti-coup efforts on the night of July 15, 2016. Rubin and others reference social media posts and videos captured by Turkish citizens, which supposedly show SADAT personnel attacking putschists on the Bosphorus Bridge in Istanbul, Turkey.

Training Islamist Jihadists
Sources state that SADAT is actively training Islamist elements who adhere to an Islamic ideology in Syria and other locations in the Middle East. These locations include Somalia and Qatar, where Turkey has established military training centers and formed cooperative partnerships with the host countries' governments. Additionally, a QatariLeaks video identifies the Sudanese port city of Suakin as another potential site of SADAT involvement.

Involvement in Syrian Civil War

In 2012 Aydınlık newspaper reported that SADAT established several bases in the Istanbul and Marmara region and trained Syrian fighters. SADAT transported Syrians in these facilities for training and then Turkey used them in Syria.

In 2015, the SADAT founder called in an interview for the establishment of autonomous Turkmen and Sunni Arab areas along the Turkish-Syrian borders.

In 2021, the Turkish mafia boss Sedat Peker accused SADAT of being involved in the arms shipment to the jihadist terrorist organization Al-Nusra Front in Syria.

Connections with Hamas
In 2018, the Israel Security Agency accused SADAT of transferring funds to Hamas.

Involvement in Libyan Civil War

In May 2013, was the first time Libya is mentioned in SADAT's website when it held a visit “to determine the needs of New Libyan Armed Forces and search for possibilities for Consultancy, Training, Ordnance service delivery for Libya.”.

In 2020, the United States Department of Defense accused SADAT of training Syrians who were sent to support pro-Turkish forces in Libya.

According to a report by the United States Africa Command, the Syrian mercenaries are paid and supervised by SADAT trainers who also trained other militias in Libya.

In March 2021, the United Nations released a report which mention that SADAT violated the UN resolutions in Libya.

Involvement in 2020 Nagorno-Karabakh war
SADAT has allegedly been responsible for recruiting, equipping, and transporting Syrian mercenaries to Azerbaijan, in order to fight at the 2020 Nagorno-Karabakh war.

References

External links 

Security consulting firms
Private military contractors
Mercenary units and formations
Business services companies established in 2012
Turkish companies established in 2012
Recep Tayyip Erdoğan controversies
Turkish involvement in the Syrian civil war
2020 Nagorno-Karabakh war
Second Libyan Civil War